The Anderson Electric was a fairly expensive French electric car with five speeds and Edison batteries; the car was only manufactured in 1912, and was shown at the Paris Salon of that year.  The 3/9 hp model cost Fr 13,500, while the 4/12 hp cost Fr 18,500.

See also 
Robert Anderson, a Scottish inventor who built one of the first automobiles in existence. The "electric carriage" was built between 1832 and 1839 and was electric powered.

Cars introduced in 1912
Brass Era vehicles
Electric vehicles introduced in the 20th century
Defunct motor vehicle manufacturers of France